Astronidium lepidotum is a species of plant in the family Melastomataceae. It is endemic to Fiji.

References

Further reading
 
 

Endemic flora of Fiji
lepidotum
Critically endangered plants
Taxonomy articles created by Polbot